EmergyCare's mission is to save lives an positively impact the health, well-being, and safety of the communities we serve.   EmergyCare was founded in 1983 as a non-profit ambulance service for the city of Erie, Pennsylvania.  Originally, the service had support from UPMC Hamot medical center and Saint Vincent Health Center, both in Erie. Today, it is an independent non profit organization. EmergyCare has gone from providing basic life support (BLS) services to the City of Erie in 1983 to providing advanced life support (ALS) care to a vast region of northwestern Pennsylvania today. EmergyCare is one of the largest non-profit ambulance services in the Commonwealth of Pennsylvania, covering more than 2,100 square miles and protecting approximately 300,000 lives.  EmergyCare has been recognized for its excellence by the PA Emergency Health Service Council (PEHSC), the American Ambulance Association (AAA), PA Ambulance Association and American Heart Association. EmergyCare currently has divisions in Erie, Corry,  Titusville, Warren and Kane.

Services provided
EmergyCare provides both emergency and non-emergency medical transportation services. They have a medical taxi service which provides ambulatory patients with transportation to and from doctors appointments. They also provide wheelchair transportation.

EmergyCare also provides non-emergency ambulance transportation. This service is used for patients who are non-ambulatory and are unable to tolerate a wheelchair, or who may need other types of monitoring, both basic and advanced. They also provide critical care transportation by ground with what is known at the Mobile Intensive Care Unit or MICU team. These crews are specially trained to provide advanced care to critical patients. These teams can consist of an Emergency Medical Technician (EMT) and Paramedic, and may also have a Pre-Hospital RN (PHRN).

EmergyCare provides emergency ambulance to all areas in their respective divisions. They also provide paramedic intercepts for residents in eastern Erie County, as well as areas in northern Crawford County.

EmergyCare Operations

The EmergyCare Operations Center is staffed around the clock, 365 days per year. The Operations Center receives information for emergency calls from the Erie County 911 Center for medical emergencies in the city of Erie, PA. The Operations Center also takes calls for and arranges other medically necessary transportation for the Northwest PA area. The Operations Center also tracks calls for outlying divisions in:

Kane
Titusville
Warren
Corry

References

External links
EmergyCare website

Companies based in Erie, Pennsylvania
Medical and health organizations based in Pennsylvania